is a Japanese actress and former gravure idol. She won the award for best supporting actress at the 28th Yokohama Film Festival for What the Snow Brings, Tegami, and Memories of Tomorrow.

Career
Fukiishi starred in Takuji Suzuki's Gegege's Wife in 2010.

She co-starred with Aoi Miyazaki, Sakura Ando and Shiori Kutsuna in Hiroshi Ishikawa's Petal Dance in 2013.

Filmography

Films
 Sabu (2002)
 Ultraman Cosmos vs. Ultraman Justice: The Final Battle (2003)
 One Missed Call (2004)
 Village Photobook (2004)
 What the Snow Brings (2005)
 Funky Forest (2005)
 Memories of Tomorrow (2006)
 Noriko's Dinner Table (2006)
 Tegami (2006)
 Bubble Fiction: Boom or Bust (2007)
 Always Zoku Sanchōme no Yūhi (2007)
 Happy Flight (2008)
 Tsuribaka Nisshi 20 (2009)
 Umizaru 3: The Last Message (2010)
 13 Assassins (2010)
 Gegege's Wife (2010)
 Himitsu no Akko-chan (2012)
 Petal Dance (2013)
 The Eternal Zero (2013)
 Kamisama no Karute 2 (2014)
 Silver Spoon (2014) as Teacher Fuji
 S The Last Policeman - Recovery of Our Future (2015)

Television

Personal life
On September 28, 2015, Fukiishi's 33rd birthday, she married Japanese actor and singer Masaharu Fukuyama. Their first child was born on December 22, 2016.

References

External links
 
 

1982 births
Living people
Actresses from Tokyo
Japanese film actresses
Japanese television actresses
Japanese television personalities
Actors from Nara Prefecture
20th-century Japanese actresses
21st-century Japanese actresses